"One More Reggae for the Road" is a song by English musician Bill Lovelady, released in 1979 as the second single from his upcoming debut album, Cheer Up. The song was co-written by Lovelady and Aubrey Cash. It reached No. 1 in Sweden in July 1980. In Norway, it peaked at No. 2.

Ingmar Nordströms recorded the song on their 1980 studio album Saxparty 7. They also recorded it with lyrics in Swedish by Olle Bergman, as "Ta din reggae en gång till", and released it as a single the same year. They were in the Swedish charts Svensktoppen with the song for five weeks between 30 November 1980–11 January 1981. The song was also recorded in Swedish by Flamingokvintetten and Schytts the same year.

Charts

References

External links 

 

1979 songs
1979 singles
1980 singles
Bill Lovelady songs
Ingmar Nordströms songs
Flamingokvintetten songs
Schytts songs
Mercury Records singles
Songs written by Bill Lovelady
Songs about reggae
Number-one singles in Sweden